The 1941 Tennessee Volunteers football team, also known as the Vols, was an American football team that represented the University of Tennessee as a member of the Southeastern Conference (SEC) in the 1941 college football season. In their first season under head coach John Barnhill, the Volunteers compiled an 8–2 record (3–1 against SEC opponents), finished second in the SEC, and outscored opponents by a total of 182 to 73/ The team played its home games at Shields–Watkins Field in Knoxville, Tennessee.

Schedule

1942 NFL Draft
Four Tennessee players were selected in the 1942 NFL Draft.

References

Tennessee
Tennessee Volunteers football seasons
Tennessee Volunteers football